The City of Springfield, Massachusetts has two official symbols, and is also often represented by depictions of the Municipal Group as a de facto emblem of its government.

City Flag

Adopted in 1923, the municipal flag of Springfield is described by the city's code in such terms–
The City adopts by this section a City flag in details as follows:
A. Such flag shall have an inner blue field bordered with gold and set in an outer white field.
B. In the center of the blue field, on both the front and reverse thereof, shall be a white shield bordered with gold.
C. Arched above the shield and set in the blue field shall be a scroll in gold bearing the inscription "Springfield."
D. Upon the seal shall be a likeness in gold of the St. Gaudens statue of Deacon Samuel Chapin.
E. Within the shield and below on both sides flanking said likeness shall be a scroll in gold bearing the inscription "A Town May 14, 1636 O.S. Organized A City May 25, 1852," all in substantial conformity with the design executed by Charles H. Restall and filed in the office of the City Clerk.

The Puritan statue in itself could be considered a symbol of Springfield; the flag appears in the former aldermanic chambers to the right of a portrait of the same. The flag is also in the current Council chambers, which once housed the Common Council. Because the city code neglects to mention specific standards for the flag's measurements, several variations of both the statue's rendering, as well as differing proportions for the flag have appeared since its adoption, including a gold border outer border not described in the code which can be seen in the examples below.

Variants

City Seal

The Seal of the City of Springfield was adopted around 1871, under the following ordinance
"No. 29. An Ordinance to Establish a City Seal.
1. Description of the seal.
Section 1. The design hereto annexed, as executed by Richard Paine, giving a view of the city, shall be the device of the city seal, the inscription being as follows, to wit : 'Springfield, organized a town May 14, 1636, O. S., a city, May 26, 1852."

Whereas the city ordinance describes a seal produced by engraver Richard Paine, the rendition from which the modern depiction is derived from was carved by engraver Thomas Chubbuck. The seal contains a number of scenes of Springfield's historic buildings. In its crest is a picture of the Springfield Armory's arsenal building with the American flag, the only recognizable landmark of the seal extant today. Below this crest sits a shield with an embellished trim and an arrow running through it from east to west. From the top, clockwise, the first scene shows a train leaving the city's first Union Station, crossing the former North End Bridge over the Connecticut River; the house on the lower right is the "Old Fort", the residence of John Pychon, built on the homestead of his father William Pynchon. Erected in 1660, it was the first brick building in the settlement, and served as a safehouse during the siege on Springfield during King Philip's War, and remained on the corner of what is now Fort Street, presently the Student Prince/Fort Restaurant, until 1831 when it was razed for new construction.
The scene on the lower left shows three smaller buildings and two steamboats on river; prior to the construction of Interstate 91, the Connecticut River played a more significant role in the livelihood of the city.

Scenes depicted

Variants

City Emblem

Often used in the city's press releases, civil patches, and official letterhead, is the Springfield Municipal Group— the group of Neoclassical buildings comprising, from left to right, Symphony Hall, the campanile, and City Hall. In addition to its clerical use the symbol is also used by the mayor, who can often be seen wearing a Municipal Group lapel pin in tandem with one of the American flag.

Usages

References

Springfield, Massachusetts
Flags of Massachusetts
Culture of Springfield, Massachusetts
Official seals of places in Massachusetts